Wayne George Angevine (born September 13, 1935) was an American politician in the state of Washington. He served in the Washington House of Representatives and Washington State Senate. He was one of the youngest people to sit in the State Senate, having been elected at the age of 23.

References

1935 births
Living people
Democratic Party members of the Washington House of Representatives
Democratic Party Washington (state) state senators